The Gryžuva is a short river in the western part of Lithuania, a tributary of the Dubysa. It begins 5 km north of Tytuvėnai city and flows mostly to the southwest. Its average width is about 6 m. Its only tributary is the Apušis river.

Rivers of Lithuania